Hebeloma populinum is a species of mushroom in the family Hymenogastraceae.

populinum
Fungi of Europe